The women's Elgon Cup is an annual competition between the national rugby union teams of Kenya and Uganda. It runs in parallel with the men's Elgon Cup, which has been running since 2004. The cup is competed for over two legs - one in each country.  Home matches for Kenya are usually played at the RFUEA Ground, Nairobi, Kenya, whilst Uganda usually play their home matches at the Kyadondo Grounds, Kampala, Uganda.

2006

 win two matches to nil

2007

Tournament cancelled

2008

One match each - but  retained the cup with an aggregate score of 31-22

2009

One match each - but  wins the cup with an aggregate score of 43-17

2010

One match each - but  wins the cup with an aggregate score of 21-16

2011

Result disputed - but trophy awarded to  following the result of the first match

2012

One match each -  wins the cup 21-18 on aggregate

2013

One game each.  win the Elgon Cup 30-26 on aggregate

2014

 win the Elgon Cup two games to nil

2015

 win the Elgon Cup two games to nil

2019
After a 3-year lull, the Elgon Cup returned in 2019, with the Kenyan Lionesses hosting the Uganda Lady Cranes in the first leg of the Cup at Mamboleo stadium in Kisumu.

 win the Elgon Cup two games to nil

See also
Elgon Cup
Women's international rugby

References

Women's rugby union competitions in Africa for national teams
Rugby union international rivalry trophies
Kenya women's national rugby union team
Uganda women's national rugby union team
International rugby union competitions hosted by Uganda
International rugby union competitions hosted by Kenya
2006 establishments in Kenya
2006 establishments in Uganda
Rugby union competitions in East Africa